The 1900 Vermont Green and Gold football team was an American football team that represented  the University of Vermont as an independent during the 1900 college football season. In their only year under head coach M. Delmar Ritchie, the team compiled a 4–4–1 record.

Schedule

References

Vermont
Vermont Catamounts football seasons
Vermont Green and Gold football